Libor Procházka (born April 25, 1974 in Vlašim, Czechoslovakia) is a Czech ice hockey player currently playing for HC Kladno of the Czech Extraliga. He was drafted 245th overall by the St. Louis Blues in the 1993 NHL Entry Draft.

He won a gold medal with the Czech Republic at the 1998 Winter Olympics in Nagano.

Career statistics

Regular season and playoffs

International

External links
 bio
 
 

1974 births
Living people
Olympic ice hockey players of the Czech Republic
Ice hockey players at the 1998 Winter Olympics
Olympic gold medalists for the Czech Republic
Czech ice hockey defencemen
HC Sparta Praha players
HC Oceláři Třinec players
HC Karlovy Vary players
Rytíři Kladno players
Olympic medalists in ice hockey
St. Louis Blues draft picks
Medalists at the 1998 Winter Olympics
People from Vlašim
Sportspeople from the Central Bohemian Region
Czechoslovak ice hockey defencemen
Czech expatriate ice hockey players in the United States
Czech expatriate ice hockey players in Sweden